"The Pager" is the fifth episode of the first season of the HBO original series The Wire. The episode was written by Ed Burns from a story by David Simon and Ed Burns and was directed by Clark Johnson. It originally aired on June 30, 2002.

Plot

The Police 

Phelan signs the wiretap affidavit for a clone of D'Angelo's pager. Freamon finds that each pager message consists of a seven-digit phone number and a two-digit identifying tag. The phone numbers used do not work, so Freamon postulates that they are using a code to mask the numbers. The code is ultimately cracked by Prez. Freamon visits Daniels' office and tells him that they need audio surveillance on the payphones surrounding the projects to make the case. He knows that Daniels is concerned about his career, but insists that they put the cases first.

Bubbles tells Greggs where to find Omar's van. She and McNulty sit on the van and wait for Omar to show up, hoping to convince him to become an informant. McNulty calls Elena and asks for his sons to come over. He insists he has everything ready, but she does not believe him and refuses to allow the visit. Meanwhile, Carver and Herc track down Bodie to the pit and violently arrest him for absconding from the juvenile detention center. Bodie refuses to consider making a deal, and the detectives respond to his insults with a savage beating. However, while waiting to hand Bodie over to juvenile intake, they end up shooting pool with him.

Bunk receives a ballistics report confirming that the shell casing from the Kresson murder is linked to the Barksdales, just as Landsman predicted. McNulty and Greggs follow Omar's van into a cemetery, where they parley. McNulty tries to convince Omar that they have an enemy in common, but Omar thinks that working with the police is wrong. McNulty reveals that Bailey has been killed; though Omar pretends to be unfazed, he reveals two things: that a Barksdale soldier named Bird killed William Gant, and that he knows that Bubbles is their informant.

The Street
After receiving a silent phone call, Avon tells Wee-Bey to remove the phone lines. Wee-Bey tells Avon he is worried they are being paranoid. Meanwhile, Omar, Bailey, and Brandon discuss their next "rip" on an East Side corner. Omar draws out a plan to trap the dealers in the alley they use. He approaches from the front carrying a shotgun while nonchalantly whistling "The Farmer in the Dell," which scares the dealers and causes them to run into Brandon and Bailey in the alley.

In the pit, Bodie and Poot discuss HIV. Bodie notices Wallace a distance away playing with a Transformers figurine and throws a bottle at the wall near him in anger, yelling that the crew keeps getting robbed because the members are not on their guard. D'Angelo takes Donette out to an expensive restaurant. Requesting a quieter table, the waiter informs D'Angelo that the other table is reserved. Donette argues that D'Angelo should have been more forceful, but he worries about seeming out of place. He wonders to Donette if there are markers of their social class that they cannot avoid showing when they appear at the nice restaurant. Donette assures D'Angelo that anyone who can pay belongs at the restaurant, though D'Angelo embarrassingly shows his unfamiliarity with the atmosphere by mistakenly reaching for a display dessert.

Avon and Stringer discuss taking over the Edmondson Avenue corners, as they are wide open. Avon suggests that Stinkum should run the territory. Bubbles tells Johnny that he is on a mission to bring down the Barksdale hoppers that beat him, but Johnny cannot understand why Bubbles is voluntarily working with the police as he feels his misfortune is all part of the "game." Avon and D'Angelo visit Avon's brother in a nursing home, who is hospitalized in a vegetative state due to an implied gunshot wound to the head, serving as an example of the dire consequences of acting carelessly in their way of life. Avon tells D'Angelo that one mistake could see either of them like his brother and that the fear motivates Avon to work harder. Later, Poot and Wallace spot Brandon in an arcade and notify D'Angelo. D'Angelo pages the news in from the pit phones. Although all the pages are logged at the detail office, the calls themselves are not recorded, so the details are useless without a wire.

Production

Title reference
The title refers to the pagers used by the Barksdale organization and cloned by the police detail.

Epigraph

Avon uses this phrase in a speech he makes to D'Angelo about the random nature of their business and the constant danger involved.  It also relates to the detail; as Freamon points out, they should have had the wire up in time to catch the discussion of Bailey's murder on the phones (and, if not that, certainly the kidnapping of Brandon).

Non-fiction elements
The conversation Bodie and Poot have about HIV/AIDS transmission is taken almost verbatim from the non-fiction book The Corner: A Year in the Life of an Inner-City Neighborhood.

Credits

Starring cast
Although credited, John Doman and Frankie Faison do not appear in this episode.

Guest stars

First appearances
Marquis "Bird" Hilton: A foul-mouthed Barksdale organization enforcer.  Though apparently responsible for the murder of Gant in the first episode, this is the first time Bird appears onscreen.  Bird is played by rapper Fredro Starr, from the group Onyx, who becomes the second of eight musicians to play minor recurring roles on The Wire (others include Method Man and Steve Earle).

Reception
An Entertainment Weekly review picked this episode as "amazing" because it begins to deliver pay-offs on the show's slowly developing plot lines. The review also praised the show's naturalistic dialogue (making an extensive comparison to funk music) and praised several of the actors for their performance. The episode's most rewarding plot lines were those that involved D'Angelo's struggles with his conscience and McNulty's battles with the bureaucracy of the police department.

References

External links
"The Pager" at HBO.com

The Wire (season 1) episodes
2002 American television episodes
Television episodes directed by Clark Johnson